The 1816 United States presidential election in New York took place between November 1 to December 4, 1816, as part of the 1816 United States presidential election. The state legislature chose 29 representatives, or electors to the Electoral College, who voted for President and Vice President.

During this election, New York cast its 29 electoral votes to Democratic Republican candidate and Secretary of State James Monroe.

See also
 United States presidential elections in New York

References

New York
1816
1816 New York (state) elections